Irakli Chomakhashvili (born 26 April 1995) is a Georgian football midfielder who plays for FC Ungheni.

External links
 
 

1995 births
Living people
Footballers from Georgia (country)
Footballers from Tbilisi
Association football midfielders
Expatriate footballers from Georgia (country)
FC Ungheni players
Moldovan Super Liga players
Expatriate sportspeople from Georgia (country) in Moldova
Expatriate footballers in Moldova